Indelible Ink (2010) is a novel by Australian author Fiona McGregor. It won the Fiction Prize and Book of the Year Award at The Age Book of the Year awards in 2011.

Plot summary

Marie King is a middle-aged Sydney divorcee. Prone to a drink and estranged from her scheming children she slowly develops a liking for tattoos and a particular tattooist.

Reviews

Geordie Williamson in The Monthly found the novel to be evocative of its setting: "Beyond the domestic drama of Indelible Ink – its tough, yet tender, appreciation of family dynamics, its revelation of character as an endless war of contradictory impulses fought within a single, human frame – McGregor has set out to exhaustively catalogue Sydney in all its guises. It is an enterprise anthropological in reach, drawing on everything from history and the built environment to gay subculture and the economics of real estate. Even the melt and drift at its close feels like a nod to the city’s endless droning summers."

Awards and nominations

 2010 shortlisted Western Australian Premier's Book Awards – Fiction 
 2011 shortlisted Indie Awards – Fiction 
 2011 shortlisted Barbara Jefferis Award 
 2011 winner The Age Book of the Year Award – Fiction Prize
 2011 winner The Age Book of the Year Award – Book of the Year

References

2010 Australian novels
Novels set in Sydney